The following lists events that happened during 2022 in the Republic of Palau.

Incumbents 

 President: Surangel S. Whipps Jr.
 Vice President: Uduch Sengebau Senior

Events 
Ongoing – COVID-19 pandemic in Oceania

 August 29 – During a trip to Taiwan, Vice President Uduch Sengebau Senior and her delegates are forced to quarantine after testing positive for COVID-19.

Sports 

 June 18 -  July 3: Palau at the 2022 World Aquatics Championships.
 July 15 -  July 24: Palau at the 2022 World Aquatics Championships.

References 

 
Years of the 21st century in Palau
2020s in Palau
Palau
Palau